This is a list of episodes of the paranormal reality series Destination Truth.

Series overview

Episodes

Season 1 (2007)

Season 2 (2008)

Season 3 (2009–10)

Season 4 (2010–11)

Season 5 (2012)

References

Lists of American non-fiction television series episodes